Castilleja integra, with the common name wholeleaf Indian paintbrush, is an herbaceous perennial plant native to the Southwestern United States.

Distribution
The plant is found in Arizona, Colorado, New Mexico, and Texas.

Castilleja integra was first discovered in the Organ Mountains of Southern New Mexico near El Paso, Texas by Charles Wright.  Its first published description was in 1858 by Asa Gray.

Uses
The Zuni people used the root's bark, mixed with minerals, to dye deerskin black.

References

integra
Flora of Arizona
Flora of Colorado
Flora of New Mexico
Flora of Texas
Plant dyes